IGB Eletrônica S.A. (Portuguese for IGB Electronics), doing business as Gradiente, is a Brazilian consumer electronics company based in Manaus, and with offices in São Paulo. The company designs and markets many product lines, including video (e.g. televisions, DVD players), audio, home theater, high end acoustics, office and mobile stereo, wireless, mobile/smart phones, and tablets for the Brazilian market.

History
The company was founded in 1964. In 1993 they founded Playtronic, a fully owned subsidiary who licensed the manufacturing of Nintendo consoles in Brazil, and while publishing games for various systems they also provided Portuguese translations of some games (among them, South Park and Shadow Man for the Nintendo 64). However, they stopped the partnership with Nintendo in 2003 because of the high price of the dollar at the time.

In 1997, Gradiente established a joint venture with Finland-based telecommunications manufacturing firm Nokia, where they were granted the license to manufacture variants of Nokia mobile phones locally under the Nokia and Gradiente brand names.

The Gradiente iPhone case 

In 2000, Gradiente, now legally known as IGB Eletrônica SA, filed for the brand name "iphone" in Brazil's INPI (National Institute of Industrial Property, the trademark authority). Only by 2008 the Brazilian government granted full brand ownership for Gradiente, and currently (since January 2012), the company is selling Android-based smartphones under this name. Until 2008 that trademark is fully owned by IGB Eletrônica SA, which released its Android-powered iphone neo one under the Gradiente brand. The iphone neo one is sold for R$ 599  (about US$287), a dual-SIM handset running Android 2.3.4 Gingerbread. It has a 3.7-inch, 320 x 480 display, a 700 MHz CPU, 2GB of expandable storage, Bluetooth, 3G, WiFi and 5 / 0.3-megapixel camera.

See also
 List of phonograph manufacturers

References

External links
 

Audio equipment manufacturers of Brazil
Mobile phone manufacturers
Phonograph manufacturers
Multinational companies headquartered in Brazil
Electronics companies established in 1964
1964 establishments in Brazil
Companies listed on B3 (stock exchange)
Brazilian brands
Mobile phone companies of Brazil
Electronics companies of Brazil
Organisations based in Manaus